Emotional climate is a concept that quantifies the “climate” of a community, being a small group, a classroom, an organization, a geographical region. Emotional climates indicate the emotional relationships interwoven among members of a community and describe the quality of the environment within a particular context. Emotional climates reflect the way most members of a community feel in a given situation.

Definition 
The concept of emotional climate was first used in educational psychology to define the effects of classroom climates on learning, and extensively used in organizational psychology to capture differences in organizational environments. Emotional climates affect individual motivation, levels of satisfaction, attitudes, expectations and behavior in a given context (e.g., a firm, a classroom). Negative emotional climates may exacerbate depressive symptoms and discourage personal growth, while positive emotional climates stimulate creativity, growth and professional development. In the framework of an organization, emotional climate appears to be a significant contributor to overall staff morale, performance and productivity.

According to Joseph De Rivera and Dario Páez emotional climates can either arise in reaction to specific collective experiences (e.g., a natural disaster) or be constructed through people's ordinary behavior and everyday interactions. People talk to each other about their feelings and their complaints, influence one another, and thus construct shared emotional patterns. Bernard Rimé argues that intense emotions, such as joy, anger, sadness, and shame, are commonly shared among individuals. These states influence people's lives, even for extended periods of time, and propagate throughout the social environment.

Emotional climates are often labeled by using names of emotions, such as joy, anger, and fear. However they can also be labeled making direct reference to the emotional relationships that are involved, such as hostility or solidarity.

Emotional atmosphere and culture
Joseph De Rivera distinguishes between emotional atmosphere (collective mood) and emotional climate. Emotional atmosphere refers to the collective behavior that a community may manifest when it is focused on a common event, emotional climate identifies instead the emotional relationships between the members of the society. He also argues that when certain emotional relationships, such as hostility and solidarity, but also joy or fear, become transmitted from generation to generation and depict stable features of a society or community, they can be referred as emotional culture.

Emotional climates and the life course
According to the life course approach, individual life course and trajectories do not develop in an empty space but they are nested into a wider social and historical context at the point that ignoring such context would lead to partial and sometimes misleading interpretations of social phenomena. Hence, emotional climates influence the life course, affecting individual emotion and perceptions, and potentially their social behavior and life choices. Research by Davide Morselli shows that emotional climates of relative large communities (regions, cantons) are tangled with other socioeconomic factors, such as the wealth and unemployment rate, and influence individual emotional response to life events.

See also

 Classroom climate
 Leadership climate 
 Emotions

References

Industrial and organizational psychology